Fernando José Macieira Ferreira Araújo da Costa Sarney (born 7 January 1956) is a Brazilian football administrator and a member of the FIFA Council.

Personal life and career
He is the son of the former President of Brazil José Sarney.

In 2009, Sarney won a court injunction, preventing the newspaper O Estado de São Paulo from publishing "his indictment on corruption charges". The newspaper published an article linking Sarney to a political scandal, Senate Secret Acts.

Sarney has been a FIFA Council member since 2015.

References

FIFA officials
Living people
Green Party (Brazil) politicians
Democratic Social Party politicians
Brazilian football managers
1956 births
Children of presidents of Brazil